Universal Code can refer to:
 Universal code (data compression), a prefix used to map integers onto binary codewords
 Universal Code (biology), another term for genetic code, the set of rules living cells to form proteins
 An alternate term for a Universal law, the concept that principles and rules governing human behaviour can gain legitimacy by demonstrating universal acceptability, applicability, translation, and philosophical basis of those rules
 Universal code (ethics), the belief that a system of ethics can apply to every sentient being
 Universal Product Code, a barcode symbology system widely used in Australia, Europe, New Zealand, North America, and other countries for tracking trade items
 Universal code (typography), a standard set of characters in typography
 Universal code (cartography), another term for the Natural Area Code, a geocode system for identifying a location on or in the volume of space around Earth